Model yacht may refer to:
 Model yachting, the pastime of building and racing model yachts
 Ship model, scale representations of ships